The Beethoven Peninsula is a deeply indented, ice-covered peninsula,  long in a northeast–southwest direction and  wide at its broadest part, forming the southwest part of Alexander Island, which lies off the southwestern portion of the Antarctic Peninsula. The south side of the peninsula is supported by the Bach Ice Shelf whilst the north side of the peninsula is supported by the Wilkins Ice Shelf. The Mendelssohn Inlet, the Brahms Inlet and the Verdi Inlet apparently intrude into it. The Bach Ice Shelf, Rossini Point and Berlioz Point are some distance away, on the Ronne Entrance from the Southern Ocean. Beethoven Peninsula is one of the eight peninsulas of Alexander Island.

The peninsula was first seen and photographed from the air in 1940 by the US Antarctic Service, which compiled the first rough map of southwest Alexander Island. It was resighted and photographed from the air by the Ronne Antarctic Research Expedition (RARE), 1947–48, and remapped from RARE photos by Derek J.H. Searle of the Falkland Islands Dependencies Survey in 1960. It was named by the UK Antarctic Place-Names Committee after the composer Ludwig van Beethoven.

See also 

 Derocher Peninsula
 Shostakovich Peninsula
 Monteverdi Peninsula

Further reading 
 Smellie, J.L., Hole, M.J. & Nell, P.A.R., Late Miocene valley-confined subglacial volcanism in northern Alexander Island, Antarctic Peninsula, Bull Volcanol 55, 273–288 (1993). https://doi.org/10.1007/BF00624355
  International Symposium on Antarctic Earth Sciences 5th : 1987, Geological Evolution of Antarctica,  Cambridge, England, P 523
  A. J. Cook and D. G. Vaughan, Overview of areal changes of the ice shelves on the Antarctic Peninsula over the past 50 year,  The Cryosphere, 4, 77–98, 2010 www.the-cryosphere.net/4/77/2010/

Further reading 

 Beethoven Peninsula on USGS website
 Beethoven Peninsula on SCAR website
 Beethoven Peninsula area map 
 Beethoven Peninsula volcanic information 
 Beethoven Peninsula current weather
 Beethoven Peninsula updated long term weather forecast
 Beethoven Peninsula sunset/ sunrise moon set/moon rise times

References 
 National Geographic Atlas of the World, 7th Edition.
 

Peninsulas of Alexander Island
Peninsula Beethoven